The Cartford Inn (formerly Cartford Hotel and Cartford Arms) is a public house and boutique hotel in Little Eccleston-with-Larbreck, Lancashire, England. It stands on the southern banks of the River Wyre, just off the Cartford Bridge, one of the few remaining toll bridges in the United Kingdom, with views to the northeast of the Forest of Bowland.

The Beaumé family have owned the inn since 2007, after they purchased it from John Smith. Julie Beaumé was born in nearby Blackpool, while Patrick Beaumé was born in the Médoc, Bordeaux.

The inn was named the UK's Pub of the Year in 2020 by The Daily Telegraph.

History
A former coaching inn, the first record of "The Cartford Inn" name was in 1839. It had become the Cartford Hotel by 1853.

A landlady in the 1960s was known as "Dirty Annie".

The establishment changed name in the 1980s to the Cartford Arms.

Accommodation
There are fifteen rooms in the main inn. There are also two cabins — named Ziggy and the Robins Nest — on the property.

The inn is included in the Michelin Guide, and has been awarded an AA five-star rating. Before the AA became the licence holder of the quality assessment schemes, the inn also received five stars from VisitEngland.

Food and drink
The inn's food, which is the work of head chef Chris Bury (formerly of The Fat Duck), was reviewed by The Guardians Jay Rayner in 2017 and The Caterers Brendan Coyne in 2015. Bury took over the head-chef position from Ian Manning in 2016.

Also on the property is the two-storey River House, which was formerly John Smith's Hart Brewery.

The inn was named the UK's 2020 Pub of the Year by The Daily Telegraph.

Gallery

References

External links
Official website of The Cartford Inn
"North west pub installs greenhouse-style dining pods ahead of reopening" - Manchester Evening News, 17 June 2020
The Cartford Inn at Geograph.co.uk

Pubs in Lancashire
Hotels in Lancashire
Coaching inns
Buildings and structures in the Borough of Fylde
1839 establishments in England